Peltoboykinia is a genus of flowering plants belonging to the family Saxifragaceae.

Its native range is Southeastern China, Japan.

Species
Species:

Peltoboykinia tellimoides 
Peltoboykinia watanabei

References

Saxifragaceae
Saxifragaceae genera